"É Preciso Saber Viver" is the eleventh single by Titãs, released in 1998. It is a cover of a song written by Roberto Carlos, the best-selling musical artist in Brazil, and Erasmo Carlos. Extra vocals were provided by Brazilian band Fat Family. The song was featured on the Rede Globo telenovela Pecado Capital.

Music video 
The music video of the song, directed by Conspiração Filmes,  shows black & white images of the band performing in studio, and later alternate shots of the members taking a look at pictures of the group start to appear as well. Most of these pictures were printed on the Volume Dois booklet.

References

1998 singles
Titãs songs